Wally Freeman was an Australian rugby league footballer in the New South Wales Rugby League(NSWRL).

Freeman played for the Eastern Suburbs club in the 1919 season. Wally is the grandfather of former coach Phil Gould.

References
 

Australian rugby league players
Sydney Roosters players
Year of birth missing
Year of death missing
Place of birth missing